Gumasthavin Magal is a 1974 Indian Tamil-language film, directed by A. P. Nagarajan, starring Sivakumar and Aarathi. Kamal Haasan appears as a villain in the film and then finally changes into a good man. The film is an adaptation of the play of the same name, previously filmed in Tamil as Gumasthavin Penn in 1941. It was released on 27 April 1974.

Plot 
Seetha and Sarasa are sisters. Their father Ramaswami who works as a clerk under a rich philanderer Mani. Mani is married to Vimala. Ramu is another rich man in the village. Ramu's mother wishes to get him married to Seetha. But Ramu refuses, and the desperate father gets her married to a doddering old man. 

The poor woman becomes a widow even before the wedding ceremony is completely over. Her father too dies in shock. Mani offers cash to Seetha and asks her to be his concubine, but Seetha rejected having lost all faith in men and commits suicide. Ramu feels he is responsible for her tragic end, and comes forward to arrange Sarasa's marriage with the now reformed Mani also willing to help the family. When the bridegroom and his family walk out over an argument over dowry which Ramu is willing to give, Mani steps in to say that the family is only after money which will ruin Sarasa's life. He insists that Ramu marry Sarasa to redeem him for ruining Seetha's life as he had done by arranging this marriage.

Cast 
 Sivakumar as Ramu
 Kamal Haasan as Mani
 Aarathi as Seetha
 Usha as Vimala
 Nagesh as Appusamy Josiyar
 V. S. Raghavan as Ramaswami
 Pandari Bai as Thiruppurasundari, Ramu's mother
 T. V. Kumudini as Pankajam, Seetha's mother
 T. K. Bhagavathi (Guest Appearance)
 S. Rama Rao
 Shakila
 Manorama (Guest Appearance)

Production
Gumasthavin Magal is an adaptation of play of same name, itself based on Nirupama Devi's Bengali novel Annapurnaar Mandir. It was previously filmed in Tamil as Gumasthavin Penn in 1941. Nagarajan who acted in the play portraying female character was the director of this adaptation.

Soundtrack 
The music was composed by Kunnakudi Vaidyanathan, while the lyrics were written by "Poovai" Senguttavan and "Ulandhurpettai" Shanmugam.

Reception 
Kanthan of Kalki praised the story and cast performances.

References

External links 
 

1970s Tamil-language films
1974 films
Films directed by A. P. Nagarajan
Films scored by Kunnakudi Vaidyanathan
Films with screenplays by A. P. Nagarajan
Indian black-and-white films
Indian films based on plays